
Gmina Wąsosz is an urban-rural gmina (administrative district) in Góra County, Lower Silesian Voivodeship, in south-western Poland.

Neighbouring gminas
Gmina Wąsosz is bordered by the gminas of Bojanowo, Góra, Jemielno, Rawicz, Wińsko and Żmigród.

Villages
Apart from the town of Wąsosz, the gmina contains the villages of Baranowice, Bartków, Bełcz Górny, Bełcz Mały, Borowna, Chocieborowice, Cieszkowice, Czaple, Czarnoborsko, Czeladź Wielka, Dochowa, Drozdowice Małe, Drozdowice Wielkie, Gola Wąsoska, Górka Wąsoska, Jawor, Kąkolno, Kamień Górowski, Kobylniki, Kowalowo, Lechitów, Lubiel, Ługi, Marysin, Młynary, Ostrawa, Płoski, Pobiel, Podmieście, Rudna Mała, Rudna Wielka, Sądowel, Stefanów, Sułów Wielki, Świniary, Unisławice, Wiewierz, Wiklina, Wodniki, Wrząca Śląska, Wrząca Wielka, Zbaków Dolny, Zbaków Górny and Zubrza.

References

Wasosz
Góra County